Gareth Turnbull (born 14 May 1979) is an Irish middle distance runner who specialises in the 1500 metres. He won the silver medal at the 2001 Summer Universiade.

Competition record

Personal bests
Outdoor
800 metres – 1:47.96 (2002 
1500 metres – 3:36.60 (Cuxhaven 2003)
One mile – 3:57.61 (Philadelphia 2002)
10,000 metres – 30:09.66 (Gateshead  2004)
Indoor
1500 metres – 3:42.97 (Ghent 2000)
One mile – 3:58.88 (New York 2007)
3000 metres – 8:00.63 (Gainesville 2006)

References

1979 births
Living people
Irish male middle-distance runners
Universiade medalists in athletics (track and field)
Universiade silver medalists for Ireland
Medalists at the 2001 Summer Universiade
Competitors at the 1999 Summer Universiade